Statistics of Turkish First Football League in the 1997–98 season.

Overview
It was contested by 18 teams, and Galatasaray S.K. won the championship. And demotion of Kayserispor, Şekerspor, Vanspor was decided.

League table

Results

Top scorers

References

Turkey - List of final tables (RSSSF)

Süper Lig seasons
1997–98 in Turkish football
Turkey